Al-Urwa (The Bond) was an Arabic magazine published in Iraq in the 1950s and financed by the US government during the cultural Cold War. The magazine intended to call on Arabs and Muslims to unite against communism, emphasizing the goodness of America and the Western world. The magazine's name was meant as an allusion to Al-Urwah al-Wuthqa, an anti-colonial magazine published in 1884 by Muhammad Abduh and Jamāl al-Dīn al-Afghānī.

See also
 Hiwar

References

Anti-communist propaganda
Anti-communism in Iraq
Arabic-language magazines
Defunct magazines published in Iraq
Defunct literary magazines
United States government propaganda organizations
United States propaganda in Iraq
Magazines with year of disestablishment missing
Magazines with year of establishment missing